Jallikattu is a 1987 Indian Tamil-language vigilante film directed by Manivannan. The film stars Sivaji Ganesan, Sathyaraj and Radha. Produced by Chitra Ramu and Chitra Lakshmanan, it was released on 28 August 1987. The title of the film is a reference to the traditional Tamil sport of the same name.

Plot

The story begins with Arjun (Sathyaraj) being arrested for multiple crimes. In the past, Arjun was a happy-go-lucky young man. His brother (Delhi Ganesh), a factory's union leader, clashed with his superiors (M. N. Nambiar, Malaysia Vasudevan and Chitra Lakshmanan) for a bonus. In the meantime, Arjun fell in love with Radha (Radha). To help the labourers, Arjun cheated the factory's owners as a fake income tax officer, he managed to take all their black money and he gave it to the labourers. The owners of the factory trap Arjun's brother, sister-in-law and his niece in their house. Arjun's sister in-law is raped and the three are killed. Arjun then tried to kill the culprit and failed. Siva Prasad (Captain Raju), Radha's brother, advised him to surrender but, being an innocent in this case, he refused. However, Siva Prasad arrested him by surprise. Arjun was then tortured. Therefore, a bald Arjun comes to the court. Despite everything being against Arjun, the judge Ram Prakash (Sivaji Ganesan) feels that he is innocent. So Ram Prakash sentences that Arjun will be under house arrest on his isolated island. 
Ram Prakash and Arjun slowly begin bonding as friends again  and Radha (Radha) shows up again after being removed from the island and shoots Ram Prakash
After few plots, twists and turns, Ram Prakash (Sivaji Ganesan) reveals his motive on choosing Arjun (Sathyaraj) 
Rama Prakash's granddaughter is kidnapped and held at ransom to release a criminal linked to above 3 criminals, and is raped and murdered brutally when Judge Ram Prakash upholds law and sentences the criminal to death by hanging.
Ram Prakash trains Arjun well in many skills and the climax gets interesting on how Arjun overtakes his enemies one by one.

Cast

Sivaji Ganesan as Ram Prakash
Sathyaraj as Arjun (Half Boiled Oliver/Chinnappadass/Kunguma Pottu Gounder/Rajaratnam)
Radha as Radha (Arukkani)
M. N. Nambiar as Dheenadalayan
Janagaraj as Janagaraj
Vennira Aadai Moorthy as Moorthy
Malaysia Vasudevan as Neelakandan Numerology
Captain Raju as Police Commissioner Sivaprasad
Chitra Lakshmanan as Dharmaraj
ARS as Lawyer Srinivasan
Rajasekhar
Charle as Arjun Friend
 Kumaresan as Arjun Friend
Thyagu as Arjun Friend
Veeraraghavan
Prameela
John Amirtharaj
Kutty Padmini as Kutty Amma
Delhi Ganesh (guest appearance)
Kokila as Karpagam (guest appearance)
Prathap K. Pothan (guest appearance)
Ramya Krishnan as TV Anchor (guest appearance)

Production 
Jallikattu is the first collaboration between Sivaji Ganesan and Manivannan.

Soundtrack
The soundtrack was composed by Ilaiyaraaja, with lyrics written by Gangai Amaran.

Release 
Jallikattu faced issues with the Censor Board before release as the Board "felt it may show the judiciary in poor light" and the filmmakers made a few cuts. Jallikattu was a commercial success, and the then Tamil Nadu Chief Minister  M. G. Ramachandran attended the 100th day celebrations which was his last function before his death on 24 December 1987.

Reception 
N. Krishnaswamy of The Indian Express wrote the film "signals some sort of peak in Satyaraj's career. It's screenplay implies that the actor has achieved such a pinnacle of popularity that he can afford to sit down, relax and look around with satisfaction. Jalikattu cumulates the popular roles Satyaraj has played till now. It is thus a compendium, a summary of his work".

References

External links 
 

1980s Tamil-language films
1980s vigilante films
1987 action films
1987 films
Films directed by Manivannan
Films scored by Ilaiyaraaja
Indian action films
Indian films about revenge
Indian vigilante films